Aphyocypris chinensis (common name: Chinese bleak) is a species of cyprinid in the genus Aphyocypris. It inhabits rivers in Japan, Korea and China.

References

Cyprinidae
Cyprinid fish of Asia